Swarna Trisha is a 1990 Indian Bengali-language action film directed by Mangal Chakraborty, starring Mithun Chakraborty, Prem Chopra, Anil Chatterjee, Tom Alter and Yogeeta Bali. It also stars Hiro Kaju Kana Zowa, Hisa-Co-Kate and Sagiri Suzuki.

Songs
"Mone Pore Sei Sob Din" - Kishore Kumar
"Janina Janina" - Asha Bhosle
"O Amar Sajani" - Kishore Kumar, Lata Mangeshkar

Cast

Mithun Chakraborty
Abhi Bhattacharya
Anil Chatterjee
Abhijit Sen
Pradeep Kumar
Prem Chopra
Yogeeta Bali
Tom Alter
Biswanath Ghosh
Daljit Kaur
Hiro Kaju Kana Zowa
Hisa-Co-Kate
Sagiri Suzuki

References

1990 films
Bengali-language Indian films
Indian action films
1990s Bengali-language films
1990 action films